Wiktor Sadowski is a Polish artist working in poster, illustration and painting. He was born in Oleandry, Poland in 1956. He graduated in 1981 at the Academy of Fine Arts in Warsaw in Tomaszewski's studio.

Major awards
1984 - Gold Medal, IX/X International Poster Biennale, Warsaw (Poland)
1985 - Gold Medal, XI Biennale of Polish poster, Katowice (Poland)
1986 - 1st and 3rd Prizes, 2nd International Theater Poster Competition, Osnabruck (Germany)
1990 - International Association of Business Communicators/IABC/Award (USA)
1990 - 3rd Prize, Art Directors Club, 69th Annual Exhibition, New York, (USA)
1991 - 2nd Prize, 3rd International Theater Poster Competition, Osnabruck (Germany)
1994 - Gold Medal, Society of Illustrators, New York (USA)

See also
List of graphic designers
List of Polish painters
List of Polish graphic designers
Graphic design

External links
Wiktor Sadowski
Wiktor Sadowski
Wiktor Sadowski - Contemporary Posters

References

1956 births
Living people
Polish graphic designers
Polish illustrators
Polish poster artists
20th-century Polish painters
20th-century Polish male artists
21st-century Polish painters
21st-century male artists
Polish male painters